Tooncurrie Parish located at 29°31′44″S 142°13′52″E just east of Tibooburra, New South Wales is a cadastral parish of Tongowoko County New South Wales. The town of Tibooburrais just outside the parish.

Geography
The Geography, of the parish is mostly the flat, arid landscape of the Channel Country. The parish has a Köppen climate classification of BWh (Hot desert). The County is barely inhabited with a population density of less than 1 person per 150 km² and the landscape is a flat arid scrubland.

Gold was found in the area in the 1870 but today the parish is just inside the Sturt National Park. Water scarcity has always been a problem to habitation.

Other than Sturt National Park, the main feature of the parish is Tibooburra airport.

References

Parishes of Kennedy County
Far West (New South Wales)